1904 in Argentine football saw Belgrano A.C. winning the Argentine championship ending a run of four consecutive titles for Alumni. Estudiantes de Buenos Aires was promoted to Primera by the Association after the good campaigns made in lower divisions and the contribution made by the club to the practice of football.

Flores did not register to play the tournament after a poor performance in the last season.

Primera División

The 1904 championship had a 6 team, league format, with each team playing the other twice.

Final standings

Lower divisions

Primera B
Champion: Barracas Athletic II

Copa Bullrich
Champion: Barracas Athletic II

Primera C
Champion: Estudiantes (BA) III

International cup

Tie Cup

Champion:  Rosario AC

Final

International friendlies 
English team Southampton toured on Argentina that year, playing several friendly matches v. clubs and combined teams. It was the first time a professional British team visited Argentina.

Notes

References

 
Seasons in Argentine football
Argentine